Tuida Cove (‘Zaliv Tuida’ \'za-liv tu-'i-da\) is the 4.13 km wide cove indenting for 1.56 km the southeast coast of Nelson Island in the South Shetland Islands, Antarctica.  It is entered east of Ivan Alexander Point and west of Slavotin Point.  The cove's shape is enhanced as a result of glacier retreat in the late 20th and early 21st century.

The feature is named after the ancient and medieval fortress of Tuida in southeastern Bulgaria.

Location

Maps
 Antarctic Digital Database (ADD). Scale 1:250000 topographic map of Antarctica. Scientific Committee on Antarctic Research (SCAR). Since 1993, regularly upgraded and updated.

References
 Tuida Cove. SCAR Composite Antarctic Gazetteer.
 Bulgarian Antarctic Gazetteer. Antarctic Place-names Commission. (details in Bulgarian, basic data in English)

External links
 Tuida Cove. Copernix satellite image

Geography of Nelson Island (South Shetland Islands)
Coves of the South Shetland Islands
Bulgaria and the Antarctic